Yemane Senior Secondary School is a school located in Fatsi, Gulomakeda woreda, Tigray Region, Ethiopia. It is one of two preparatory schools in Gulomakeda (ጙሎማከዳ), the other being Zalambessa Senior Secondary School.

History 
In 2018, 92 grade eleven students at Yemane Senior Secondary School were participants in a study about the "Effects of Integrated Reading-and-Writing Practice on EFL Learners’ Perceived Efficacy of Reading and Writing".

References 

Educational institutions with year of establishment missing
Secondary schools in Ethiopia
Tigray Region